"No Trespassing" is a song recorded by Canadian country music artist George Fox. Released in 1989 as the first single from his second studio album, With All My Might, it peaked at number 10 on the RPM Country Tracks chart in February 1990.

Chart performance

References

1989 songs
1989 singles
George Fox songs
Warner Music Group singles
Songs written by George Fox (singer)